The 1969–70 Liga Leumit season saw Maccabi Tel Aviv win the title on goal difference from city rivals, Hapoel, and qualify for the 1971 Asian Club Championship. Maccabi Jaffa and Hapoel Be'er Sheva were relegated to Liga Alef. Moshe Romano of Shimshon Tel Aviv was the league's top scorer with 15 goals.

Starting from this season the first tiebreaker in case teams were equal on points was set to be goal difference.

Final table

Results

References
Israel - List of final tables RSSSF

Liga Leumit seasons
Israel
1969–70 in Israeli football leagues